Peter and the Test Tube Babies are an English punk rock band, formed in the small town of Peacehaven, England in 1978, by Derek "Strangefish" Greening and Peter Bywaters. Due to their humorous tongue-in-cheek lyrics, they have been considered part of the Punk Pathetique subgenre.

History
Peter and the Test Tube Babies were first featured in Sounds magazine in July 1980, and after a John Peel Radio One session, made their vinyl debut on the Brighton compilation album Vaultage 78.

In recent years the band has played at festivals including the 11th Antifest in 2005. They also had two songs on the Oi! compilation Oi! the Album in that same year. They favoured absurd lyrics and strange titles, such as "The Queen Gives Good Blow Jobs". In 1982, they covered the chart-topping Gary Glitter hit "I'm the Leader of the Gang (I Am)" on their album Pissed and Proud.

When the band is not touring, Peter Bywaters offers personal English as a second language tuition on a live-in basis at his home in Brighton.

Del Strangefish currently hosts a punk rock radio show with Jimmy Skurvi of the Brighton punk band, Skurvi, on Brighton's Radio Reverb. The shows are also podcasted every week on his podcast page.

In 2017, Peter Bywaters was refused entry and deported from the US, apparently for having imitated Donald Trump the previous year; however, U.S. Customs and Border Protection officials said that he was deported for having the wrong visa.

Members

Current line-up
 Peter Bywaters  — Vocals
 Derek "Strangefish" Greening  — Guitar
 Nick Abnett  — Bass
 Sam Fuller  — Drums

Original line-up
 Peter Bywaters  — Vocals
 Derek "Strangefish" Greening  — Guitar
 Chris "Trapper" Marchant  — Bass
 Trev Rutherford  — Drums

Discography

Albums
 Pissed and Proud, 1982
 The Mating Sounds of South American Frogs, 1983
 Journey to the Centre of Johnny Clarke's Head, 1984
 The Loud Blaring Punk Rock LP, 1985
 Soberphobia, 1986
 Live and Loud!! - More Chin Shouting, 1990
 The $hit Factory, 1990
 Cringe, 1991
 Supermodels, 1995
 Schwein Lake Live, 1996
 Alien Pubduction, 1998
 A Foot Full of Bullets, 2005
 Piss Ups, 2012
 That Shallot, 2017
 Fuctifano, 2020

EPs and singles
 "Banned From The Pubs", 1982
 "Run Like Hell", 1982
 3 x 45, 1983
 The Jinx, 1983
 Zombie Creeping Flesh, 1983
 Pressed for Ca$h EP, 1984
 Rotting in the Fart Sack EP, 1985
 Key To The City, 1986
 Fuck The Millennium, 2000 (Free New Year's Eve Sampler)

Compilation appearances
 Vaultage 78, 1978
 Oi The Album "Rob A Bank (Wanna)" 1980
 The Kids Are United "Rob A Bank" 1981
 Carry On Oi "Transvestite", "Maniac"1981
 The Secret Life of Punks "Maniac" 1982
 Punk and Disorderly,  1982
 There Is No Future "Banned From The Pubs", "Up Yer Bum" 1984
 Angels With Dirty Faces "Banned From The Pubs", "Moped Lads" 1984
 Viva La Revolution "Run Like Hell" 1985
 The Best of Peter and the Test Tube Babies, 1988
 Oi Chartbusters Vol.5 "Transvestite" 1989
 Test Tube Trash, 1994
 The Punk Singles Collection, 1995

References

External links

 Official Homepage
 Discography

English punk rock groups
Musical groups from Brighton and Hove
Musical groups established in 1978
1978 establishments in England
Arising Empire artists